The 2007 Tour Down Under was held from 16  to 21 January 2007 in and around Adelaide, South Australia. It was a multiple stage road cycling race that took part over five stages with a total of 667 kilometres and is part of the 2006–07 UCI Oceania Tour. The 2007 Down Under Classic was the official warm-up race for the event.

Men's stage summary

Other leading top threes

Men's top 10 overall

Women's stage summary

References
 Official website
 Cyclingnews.com Tour Down Under 2007 site

2007
2007 in road cycling
2007 in Australian sport
2007 in Oceanian sport
Tour Down Under (women)
2007 in women's road cycling
January 2007 sports events in Australia